The UK Athletics Championships was an annual national championship in track and field for the United Kingdom, organised by the British Athletics Federation. The event incorporated the 1980 Olympic trials for the British Olympic team. The venue for the event was rotational and designed to be inclusive – all four Home Nations hosted the event during its twenty-year existence, as well as several areas of England.

Created in 1977 and open only to British athletes, the event was initiated to provide an alternative to the AAA Championships, which was open to foreign athletes and was organised by an English amateur organisation. The event failed to displace the long-established AAA event and did not attract the nation's best athletes. The event was not part of a formal international selection process and the competition's early scheduling in the calendar was not conducive to participation; the event often took place in May, which was well before the peak of the track and field season in August and early September.

The annual format ceased after 1993. The British Athletics Federation organised a "British Championships" event in 1997, which proved to be the most important domestic competition that season. The bankruptcy of the British Athletics Federation that same year effectively rendered the competition defunct. Both the UK Championships, and the AAA Championships would later be superseded by the British Athletics Championships, organised by UK Athletics – the government-led successor organisation to the British Athletics Federation.

Events
The following athletics events featured as standard on the UK Athletics Championships programme:

 Sprint: 100 m, 200 m, 400 m
 Distance track events: 800 m, 1500 m, 5000 m
 Hurdles: 100 m hurdles (women only), 110 m hurdles (men only), 400 m hurdles, 3000 m steeplechase (men only)
 Jumps: long jump, triple jump, high jump, pole vault
 Throws: shot put, discus, hammer, javelin
 Racewalking: 5000 m walk (women only), 10,000 metres walk (men only)

A men's 3000 metres was contested from 1989 to 1993, while the women's event lasted from 1977 to 1992, being the standard distance event for women at the time. Women raced over 5000 m from 1982 to 1997, with interruptions in 1986–87 and 1990–93. The men's 10,000 metres was stopped after 1988, with a one-off re-instatement in 1997. Women raced over that distance in 1986 and 1997 only. The men's and women's walking events were first introduced at the 1980 edition, though were dropped as a one-off at the 1992 edition. The women's walk was also dropped from the programme for the 1982 championships.

The javelin model used in the men's event changed to the international standard in 1986. In line with international changes, the women's programme gradually expanded to match the men's, with the first triple jump championship held in 1990, then the first women's pole vault and hammer throw UK champions being crowned in 1993.

Editions

Most successful athletes by event

Multiple champions
A total of 18 athletes won five or more titles at the UK Athletics Championships. Women's shot putter Judy Oakes won the most titles overall, with ten national wins. Linford Christie was the most successful man, with eight titles across the 100 metres and 200 metres.

See also
List of British athletics champions

References

 
Defunct athletics competitions
National athletics competitions
Athletics competitions in the United Kingdom
1977 establishments in the United Kingdom
1997 disestablishments in the United Kingdom
Recurring sporting events established in 1977
Recurring sporting events disestablished in 1997
Defunct sports competitions in the United Kingdom